Estradiol diacetate (EDA), or estradiol 3,17β-diacetate, is an estrogen and an estrogen ester—specifically, the C3 and C17β diacetate ester of estradiol—which was never marketed. It is related to the estradiol monoesters estradiol acetate (estradiol 3-acetate; Femtrace) and estradiol 17β-acetate.

See also
 List of estrogen esters § Estradiol esters

References

Abandoned drugs
Acetate esters
Estradiol esters
Prodrugs
Secondary alcohols
Synthetic estrogens